Fabrizio Paolucci (1565 – 30 January 1625) was a Roman Catholic prelate who served as Bishop of Città della Pieve (1605–1625).

Biography
Fabrizio Paolucci was born in Forlì, Italy in 1565.

On 3 August 1605, he was appointed during the papacy of Pope Paul V as Bishop of Città della Pieve. On 7 August 1605, he was consecrated bishop by Alfonso Visconti, Bishop of Spoleto.

He served as Bishop of Città della Pieve until his death on 30 January 1625.

See also 
Catholic Church in Italy

References

External links and additional sources
 (for Chronology of Bishops) 
 (for Chronology of Bishops)  

17th-century Italian Roman Catholic bishops
Bishops appointed by Pope Paul V
1565 births
1625 deaths